This is an alphabetical list of the 2,891 obcí (singular obec, "municipality") in Slovakia. They are grouped into 79 districts (okresy, singular okres), in turn grouped into 8 regions (kraje, singular kraj); articles on individual districts and regions list their municipalities. 

 Ábelová 
 Abovce 
 Abrahám 
 Abrahámovce, Bardejov District 
 Abrahámovce, Kežmarok District 
 Abramová 
 Abranovce 
 Adamovské Kochanovce 
 Adidovce 
 Alekšince 
 Andovce 
 Andrejová 
 Ardanovce 
 Ardovo 
 Arnutovce 
 Báb 
 Babie 
 Babín 
 Babiná 
 Babindol 
 Babinec 
 Bacúch 
 Bacúrov 
 Báč 
 Bačka 
 Bačkov 
 Bačkovík 
 Baďan 
 Bádice 
 Badín 
 Báhoň 
 Bajany 
 Bajč 
 Bajerov 
 Bajerovce 
 Bajka 
 Bajtava 
 Baka 
 Baláže 
 Baldovce 
 Balog nad Ipľom 
 Baloň 
 Baňa 
 Banka 
 Bánov 
 Bánovce nad Bebravou 
 Bánovce nad Ondavou 
 Banská Belá 
 Banská Bystrica 
 Banská Štiavnica 
 Banské 
 Banský Studenec 
 Bara 
 Barca 
 Bardejov 
 Bardoňovo 
 Bartošova Lehôtka 
 Bartošovce 
 Baška 
 Baškovce 
 Baškovce 
 Bašovce 
 Batizovce 
 Bátka 
 Bátorová 
 Bátorove Kosihy 
 Bátovce 
 Beckov 
 Beharovce 
 Becherov 
 Belá nad Cirochou 
 Belá 
 Belá 
 Beladice 
 Belá-Dulice 
 Belejovce 
 Belín 
 Belina 
 Belince 
 Bellova Ves 
 Beloveža 
 Beluj 
 Beluša 
 Belža 
 Beňadiková 
 Beňadikovce 
 Beňadovo 
 Beňatina 
 Beniakovce 
 Benice 
 Benkovce 
 Beňuš 
 Bernolákovo 
 Bertotovce 
 Beša 
 Beša 
 Bešeňov 
 Betlanovce 
 Betliar 
 Bežovce 
 Bidovce 
 Biel 
 Bielovce 
 Biely Kostol 
 Bijacovce 
 Bílkove Humence 
 Bíňa 
 Bíňovce 
 Biskupice 
 Biskupová 
 Bitarová 
 Blahová 
 Blatná na Ostrove 
 Blatná Polianka 
 Blatné Remety 
 Blatné Revištia 
 Blatné 
 Blatnica 
 Blažice 
 Blažovce 
 Blesovce 
 Blhovce 
 Bobot 
 Bobrov 
 Bobrovček 
 Bobrovec 
 Bobrovník 
 Bočiar 
 Bodíky 
 Bodiná 
 Bodorová 
 Bodovce 
 Bodružal 
 Bodza 
 Bodzianske Lúky 
 Bogliarka 
 Bohdanovce nad Trnavou 
 Bohdanovce 
 Boheľov 
 Bohunice 
 Bohunice 
 Bohúňovo 
 Bojná 
 Bojnice 
 Bojničky 
 Boľ 
 Boldog 
 Boleráz 
 Bolešov 
 Boliarov 
 Boľkovce 
 Borcová 
 Borčany 
 Borčice 
 Borinka 
 Borová 
 Borovce 
 Borský Mikuláš 
 Borský Svätý Jur 
 Borša 
 Bory 
 Bošáca 
 Bošany 
 Boťany 
 Bottovo 
 Bôrka 
 Bracovce 
 Branč 
 Branovo 
 Bratislava 
 Braväcovo 
 Brdárka 
 Brehov 
 Brehy 
 Brekov 
 Brestov nad Laborcom 
 Brestov 
 Brestov 
 Brestovany 
 Brestovec 
 Brestovec 
 Bretejovce 
 Bretka 
 Bretka 
 Breza 
 Brezany 
 Brezina 
 Breziny 
 Breznica 
 Breznička 
 Breznička 
 Brezno 
 Brezolupy 
 Brezov 
 Brezová pod Bradlom 
 Brezovec 
 Brezovica 
 Brezovica 
 Brezovička 
 Brezovka 
 Brežany 
 Brhlovce 
 Brieštie 
 Brodské 
 Brodzany 
 Brunovce 
 Brusnica 
 Brusník 
 Brutovce 
 Bruty 
 Brvnište 
 Brzotín 
 Buclovany 
 Búč 
 Bučany 
 Budikovany 
 Budimír 
 Budince 
 Budiš 
 Budkovce 
 Budmerice 
 Buglovce 
 Buková 
 Bukovce 
 Bukovec 
 Bukovec 
 Bukovina 
 Bulhary 
 Bunetice 
 Bunkovce 
 Bušince 
 Bušovce 
 Buzica 
 Bystrá 
 Bystrá 
 Bystrany 
 Bystré 
 Bystričany 
 Bystrička 
 Byšta 
 Byšta 
 Bytča 
 Bzenica 
 Bzenov 
 Bzince pod Javorinou 
 Bziny 
 Bzovík 
 Bžany 
 Cabaj-Čápor 
 Cabov 
 Cakov 
 Cejkov 
 Cernina 
 Cerová 
 Cerovo 
 Cestice 
 Cífer 
 Cigeľ 
 Cigeľka 
 Cigla 
 Cimenná 
 Cinobaňa 
 Čab 
 Čabalovce 
 Čabiny 
 Čabradský Vrbovok 
 Čadca 
 Čachtice 
 Čajkov 
 Čaka 
 Čakajovce 
 Čakanovce 
 Čakanovce 
 Čakany 
 Čaklov 
 Čalovec 
 Čamovce 
 Čaňa 
 Čaradice 
 Čáry 
 Častá 
 Častkov 
 Častkovce 
 Čata 
 Čataj 
 Čavoj 
 Čebovce 
 Čečehov 
 Čečejovce 
 Čechy 
 Čechynce 
 Čekovce 
 Čeľadice 
 Čeľadince 
 Čeláre 
 Čelkova Lehota 
 Čelovce 
 Čeľovce 
 Čelovce 
 Čenkovce 
 Čereňany 
 Čerenčany 
 Čerhov 
 Čermany 
 Černík 
 Černochov 
 Čertižné 
 Červená Voda 
 Červeňany 
 Červenica pri Sabinove 
 Červenica 
 Červeník 
 Červený Hrádok 
 Červený Kameň 
 Červený Kláštor 
 České Brezovo 
 Čičarovce 
 Čičarovce 
 Čičava 
 Čičmany 
 Číčov 
 Čierna Lehota 
 Čierna Lehota 
 Čierna nad Tisou 
 Čierna Voda 
 Čierna 
 Čierne Kľačany 
 Čierne nad Topľou 
 Čierne Pole 
 Čierne 
 Čierny Balog 
 Čierny Brod 
 Čierny Potok 
 Čifáre 
 Čiližská Radvaň 
 Čimhová 
 Čirč 
 Číž 
 Čižatice 
 Čižatice 
 Čoltovo 
 Čremošné 
 Čučma 
 Dačov Lom 
 Ďačov 
 Daletice 
 Danišovce 
 Ďanová 
 Ďapalovce 
 Dargov 
 Davidov 
 Debraď 
 Dedina Mládeže 
 Dedinka 
 Dedinky 
 Dechtice 
 Dekýš 
 Demandice 
 Demänovská Dolina 
 Demjata 
 Detrík 
 Detva 
 Detvianska Huta 
 Devičany 
 Devičie 
 Dežerice 
 Diaková 
 Diakovce 
 Diviacka Nová Ves 
 Diviaky nad Nitricou 
 Divín 
 Divina 
 Divinka 
 Dlhá nad Kysucou 
 Dlhá nad Oravou 
 Dlhá nad Váhom 
 Dlhá Ves 
 Dlhá 
 Dlhé Klčovo 
 Dlhé nad Cirochou 
 Dlhé Pole 
 Dlhé Stráže 
 Dlhoňa 
 Dlžín 
 Dobrá Voda 
 Dobrá 
 Dobroč 
 Dobrohošť 
 Dobroslava 
 Dobšiná 
 Dohňany 
 Dojč 
 Doľany 
 Doľany 
 Dolinka 
 Dolná Breznica 
 Dolná Krupá 
 Dolná Lehota 
 Dolná Mariková 
 Dolná Poruba 
 Dolná Seč 
 Dolná Streda 
 Dolná Strehová 
 Dolná Súča 
 Dolná Tižina 
 Dolná Trnávka 
 Dolná Ves 
 Dolná Ždaňa 
 Dolné Dubové 
 Dolné Kočkovce 
 Dolné Lefantovce 
 Dolné Lovčice 
 Dolné Mladonice 
 Dolné Naštice 
 Dolné Obdokovce 
 Dolné Orešany 
 Dolné Otrokovce 
 Dolné Plachtince 
 Dolné Saliby 
 Dolné Semerovce 
 Dolné Srnie 
 Dolné Strháre 
 Dolné Trhovište 
 Dolné Vestenice 
 Dolné Zahorany 
 Dolné Zelenice 
 Dolný Badín 
 Dolný Bar 
 Dolný Hričov 
 Dolný Chotár 
 Dolný Kalník 
 Dolný Kubín 
 Dolný Lieskov 
 Dolný Lopašov 
 Dolný Ohaj 
 Dolný Pial 
 Dolný Štál 
 Dolný Vadičov 
 Domadice 
 Domaníky 
 Domaniža 
 Domaňovce 
 Donovaly 
 Drábsko 
 Drahňov 
 Drahovce 
 Dravce 
 Dražice 
 Dražkovce 
 Drážovce 
 Drienčany 
 Drienica 
 Drienov 
 Drienovec 
 Drienovo 
 Drienovská Nová Ves 
 Drietoma 
 Drňa 
 Drnava 
 Družstevná pri Hornáde 
 Drženice 
 Držkovce 
 Ďubákovo 
 Dubinné 
 Dubnica nad Váhom 
 Dubnička 
 Dubník 
 Dubno 
 Dubodiel 
 Dubová 
 Dubová 
 Dubovany 
 Dubovce 
 Dubové 
 Dubovec 
 Dubovica 
 Dúbrava 
 Dúbrava 
 Dúbravka 
 Dúbravy 
 Ducové 
 Dudince 
 Dukovce 
 Dulov 
 Dulova Ves 
 Dulovce 
 Dulovo 
 Dunajov 
 Dunajská Lužná 
 Gajary 
 Dunajská Streda 
 Dunajský Klátov 
 Ďurčiná 
 Ďurďoš 
 Ďurďošík 
 Ďurďové 
 Ďurkov 
 Ďurková 
 Ďurkovce 
 Dvorany nad Nitrou 
 Dvorec 
 Dvorianky 
 Dvorníky 
 Dvorníky-Včeláre 
 Dvory nad Žitavou 
 Egreš 
 Fačkov 
 Falkušovce 
 Farná 
 Fekišovce 
 Figa 
 Fijaš 
 Fiľakovo 
 Fiľakovské Kováče 
 Fintice 
 Folkušová 
 Forbasy 
 Frička 
 Fričkovce 
 Fričovce 
 Fulianka 
 Gabčíkovo 
 Gaboltov 
 Galanta 
 Galovany 
 Gáň 
 Gánovce 
 Gbeľany 
 Gbelce 
 Gbely 
 Geča 
 Gelnica 
 Gemer 
 Gemerček 
 Gemerská Hôrka 
 Gemerská Panica 
 Gemerská Poloma 
 Gemerská Ves 
 Gemerské Dechtáre 
 Gemerské Michalovce 
 Gemerské Teplice 
 Gemerský Jablonec 
 Gemerský Sad 
 Geraltov 
 Gerlachov, Bardejov District 
 Gerlachov, Poprad District 
 Giglovce 
 Giraltovce 
 Girovce 
 Glabušovce 
 Gočaltovo 
 Gočovo 
 Golianovo 
 Gortva 
 Gôtovany 
 Granč-Petrovce 
 Gregorova Vieska 
 Gregorovce 
 Gyňov 
 Habovka 
 Habura 
 Hačava 
 Háj 
 Háj 
 Hajná Nová Ves 
 Hajnáčka 
 Hájske 
 Hajtovka 
 Haláčovce 
 Halič 
 Haligovce 
 Haluzice 
 Hamuliakovo 
 Handlová 
 Hanigovce 
 Haniska 
 Haniska 
 Hanková 
 Hankovce 
 Hanušovce nad Topľou 
 Harakovce 
 Harhaj 
 Harichovce 
 Hatalov 
 Hatné 
 Havka 
 Havranec 
 Hažín 
 Hažlín 
 Helcmanovce 
 Heľpa 
 Henckovce 
 Henclová 
 Hencovce 
 Hendrichovce 
 Herľany 
 Hermanovce nad Topľou 
 Hermanovce 
 Hertník 
 Hervartov 
 Hincovce 
 Hladovka 
 Hlboké nad Váhom 
 Hlboké 
 Hliník nad Hronom 
 Hlinné 
 Hlivištia 
 Hlohovec 
 Hniezdne 
 Hnilčík 
 Hnilec 
 Hnojné 
 Hnúšťa 
 Hodejov 
 Hodejovec 
 Hodkovce 
 Hodruša-Hámre 
 Hokovce 
 Holčíkovce 
 Holiare 
 Holice 
 Holíč 
 Holiša 
 Holumnica 
 Honce 
 Hontianska Vrbica 
 Hontianske Moravce 
 Hontianske Nemce 
 Hontianske Tesáre 
 Hontianske Trsťany 
 Horná Breznica 
 Horná Kráľová 
 Horná Krupá 
 Horná Lehota 
 Horná Lehota 
 Horná Mariková 
 Horná Poruba 
 Horná Potôň 
 Horná Seč 
 Horná Streda 
 Horná Strehová 
 Horná Súča 
 Horná Štubňa 
 Horná Ves 
 Horná Ves 
 Horná Ždaňa 
 Horňa 
 Horňany 
 Horné Dubové 
 Horné Hámre 
 Horné Chlebany 
 Horné Lefantovce 
 Horné Mladonice 
 Horné Mýto 
 Horné Naštice 
 Horné Obdokovce 
 Horné Orešany 
 Horné Otrokovce 
 Horné Plachtince 
 Horné Saliby 
 Horné Semerovce 
 Horné Srnie 
 Horné Strháre 
 Horné Štitáre 
 Horné Trhovište 
 Horné Turovce 
 Horné Vestenice 
 Horné Zahorany 
 Horné Zelenice 
 Horný Badín 
 Horný Bar 
 Horný Hričov 
 Horný Kalník 
 Horný Lieskov 
 Horný Pial 
 Horný Tisovník 
 Horný Vadičov 
 Horovce 
 Horovce 
 Hoste 
 Hostice 
 Hostie 
 Hostišovce 
 Hosťová 
 Hosťovce 
 Hosťovce 
 Hozelec 
 Hôrka nad Váhom 
 Hôrka 
 Hôrky 
 Hrabičov 
 Hrabkov 
 Hrabovčík 
 Hrabovec 
 Hrabovka 
 Hrabské 
 Hrabušice 
 Hradisko 
 Hradište pod Vrátnom 
 Hradište 
 Hradište 
 Hrádok 
 Hrachovište 
 Hrachovo 
 Hraň 
 Hraničné 
 Hranovnica 
 Hrašné 
 Hrašovík 
 Hrčeľ 
 Hrhov 
 Hriadky 
 Hričovské Podhradie 
 Hriňová 
 Hrišovce 
 Hrkovce 
 Hrlica 
 Hrnčiarovce nad Parnou 
 Hrnčiarska Ves 
 Hrnčiarske Zalužany 
 Hromoš 
 Hronec 
 Hronovce 
 Hronská Dúbrava 
 Hronské Kľačany 
 Hronské Kosihy 
 Hrubá Borša 
 Hruboňovo 
 Hrubý Šúr 
 Hrušov 
 Hrušov 
 Hrušovany 
 Hrušovo 
 Hruštín 
 Hubice 
 Hubina 
 Hubošovce 
 Hubová 
 Hubovo 
 Hucín 
 Hul 
 Huncovce 
 Hunkovce 
 Hurbanova Ves 
 Igram 
 Hurbanovo 
 Husák 
 Husiná 
 Hutka 
 Huty 
 Hviezdoslavov 
 Hvozdnica 
 Hybe 
 Hýľov 
 Chanava 
 Chľaba 
 Chlebnice 
 Chmeľnica 
 Chmeľov 
 Chmeľová 
 Chmeľovec 
 Chmiňany 
 Chminianska Nová Ves 
 Chminianske Jakubovany 
 Choča 
 Chocholná-Velčice 
 Choňkovce 
 Chorvátsky Grob 
 Chorváty 
 Chotín 
 Chrabrany 
 Chrámec 
 Chrasť nad Hornádom 
 Chrastince 
 Chrastné 
 Chrenovec-Brusno 
 Chropov 
 Chrťany 
 Chtelnica 
 Chudá Lehota 
 Chvalová 
 Chvojnica 
 Chvojnica 
 Chynorany 
 Chyžné 
 Ihľany 
 Ihráč 
 Ilava 
 Iliašovce 
 Ilija 
 Imeľ 
 Iňa 
 Iňačovce 
 Inovce 
 Ipeľské Predmostie 
 Ipeľské Úľany 
 Ipeľský Sokolec 
 Istebné 
 Ivachnová 
 Ivančiná 
 Ivanice 
 Ivanka pri Dunaji 
 Ivanka pri Nitre 
 Ivanovce 
 Iža 
 Ižipovce 
 Ižkovce 
 Jablonec 
 Jablonica 
 Jablonka 
 Jablonov nad Turňou 
 Jablonov 
 Jabloňovce 
 Jablonové 
 Jablonové 
 Jacovce 
 Jahodná 
 Jaklovce 
 Jakovany 
 Jakubany 
 Jakubov 
 Jakubova Voľa 
 Jakubovany 
 Jakubovany 
 Jalovec 
 Jalovec 
 Jalšové 
 Jalšovík 
 Jamník 
 Jamník 
 Janice, Rimavská Sobota 
 Janík 
 Janíky 
 Janov 
 Janova Lehota 
 Janovce 
 Jánovce 
 Jánovce 
 Janovík 
 Jarabá 
 Jarabina 
 Jarok 
 Jarovnice 
 Jasenica 
 Jasenie 
 Jasenov 
 Jasenov 
 Jasenová 
 Jasenovce 
 Jasenové 
 Jasenovo 
 Jaslovské Bohunice 
 Jasov 
 Jasová 
 Jastrabá 
 Jastrabie nad Topľou 
 Jastrabie pri Michalovciach 
 Jatov 
 Javorina 
 Jazernica 
 Jedlinka 
 Jedľové Kostoľany 
 Jelenec 
 Jelka 
 Jelšava 
 Jelšovce 
 Jelšovec 
 Jenkovce 
 Jesenské 
 Jesenské 
 Jestice 
 Ješkova Ves 
 Jezersko 
 Jovice 
 Jovsa 
 Jur nad Hronom 
 Jurkova Voľa 
 Jurová 
 Jurské 
 Juskova Voľa 
 Kačanov 
 Kajal 
 Kaľamenová 
 Kalameny 
 Kaľava 
 Kalinkovo 
 Kalinov 
 Kalinovo 
 Kalná nad Hronom 
 Kalnica 
 Kalnište 
 Kalonda 
 Kaloša 
 Kalša 
 Kaluža 
 Kamanová 
 Kameňany 
 Kamenec pod Vtáčnikom 
 Kamenica nad Hronom 
 Kamenica 
 Kameničany 
 Kameničná 
 Kamenín 
 Kamenná Poruba 
 Kamenná Poruba 
 Kamenné Kosihy 
 Kamenný Most 
 Kamienka, Humenné District 
 Kamienka, Stará Ľubovňa District 
 Kanianka 
 Kapince 
 Kapišová 
 Kaplná 
 Kapušany 
 Kapušianske Kľačany 
 Karlová 
 Kašov 
 Kátlovce 
 Kátov 
 Kazimír 
 Kecerovce 
 Kecerovský Lipovec 
 Kečkovce 
 Kečovo 
 Kechnec 
 Kendice 
 Kesovce 
 Keť 
 Kežmarok 
 Kiarov 
 Kľačany 
 Kľače 
 Kľačno 
 Kladzany 
 Kľak 
 Klasov 
 Kláštor pod Znievom 
 Klátova Nová Ves 
 Klčov 
 Kleňany 
 Klenov 
 Klenovec 
 Klieština 
 Klin nad Bodrogom 
 Klin 
 Klížska Nemá 
 Klokoč 
 Klokočov 
 Klokočov 
 Klubina 
 Kľúčovec 
 Kluknava 
 Kľušov 
 Kmeťovo 
 Kobeliarovo 
 Kobylnice 
 Kobyly 
 Koceľovce 
 Kociha 
 Kocurany 
 Kočín-Lančár 
 Kočovce 
 Kochanovce, Bardejov District 
 Kochanovce, Humenné District 
 Kojatice 
 Kojšov 
 Kokava nad Rimavicou 
 Kokošovce 
 Kokšov-Bakša 
 Kolačkov 
 Kolačno 
 Koláre 
 Kolárovice 
 Kolárovo 
 Kolibabovce 
 Kolíňany 
 Kolinovce 
 Kolta 
 Komárany 
 Komárno 
 Komárov 
 Komárovce 
 Komjatice 
 Komjatná 
 Komoča 
 Koniarovce 
 Konrádovce 
 Konská 
 Konská 
 Koňuš 
 Kopčany 
 Kopernica 
 Koplotovce 
 Koprivnica 
 Korejovce 
 Korňa 
 Koromľa 
 Korytárky 
 Korytné 
 Kosihovce 
 Kosihy nad Ipľom 
 Kosorín 
 Kostoľany pod Tribečom 
 Kostolec 
 Kostolište 
 Kostolná pri Dunaji 
 Kostolná Ves 
 Kostolná-Záriečie 
 Kostolné Kračany 
 Kostolné 
 Koš 
 Košariská 
 Košeca 
 Košecké Podhradie 
 Košice 
 Košická Belá 
 Košická Polianka 
 Košické Oľšany 
 Košický Klečenov 
 Košolná 
 Košťany nad Turcom 
 Košúty 
 Kotešová 
 Kotmanová 
 Kotrčiná Lúčka 
 Kováčová 
 Kováčová 
 Kováčovce 
 Koválov 
 Koválovec 
 Kovarce 
 Kozárovce 
 Kozelník 
 Kozí Vrbovok 
 Kožany 
 Kožuchov 
 Kračúnovce 
 Krahule 
 Krajná Bystrá 
 Krajná Poľana 
 Krajná Porúbka 
 Krajné Čierno 
 Krajné 
 Krakovany 
 Kráľ 
 Kráľov Brod 
 Kráľova Lehota 
 Kráľová nad Váhom 
 Kráľová pri Senci 
 Kraľovany 
 Kráľovce 
 Kráľovce-Krnišov 
 Kráľovičove Kračany 
 Kráľovský Chlmec 
 Krásna Lúka 
 Krásna Ves 
 Krasňany 
 Krásno nad Kysucou 
 Krásno 
 Krásnohorská Dlhá Lúka 
 Krásnohorské Podhradie 
 Krásnovce 
 Krásny Brod 
 Kravany nad Dunajom 
 Kravany 
 Kravany 
 Krčava 
 Kremná 
 Kremnica 
 Kremnické Bane 
 Kristy 
 Krišovská Liesková 
 Krivá 
 Kriváň (village) 
 Krivany 
 Krivé 
 Krivoklát 
 Krivosúd-Bodovka 
 Kríže 
 Krížová Ves 
 Križovany nad Dudváhom 
 Križovany 
 Krná 
 Krnča 
 Krokava 
 Krompachy 
 Krpeľany 
 Krškany 
 Krtovce 
 Krupina 
 Krušetnica 
 Krušovce 
 Kružlov 
 Kružlová 
 Kružná 
 Kružno 
 Kšinná 
 Kubáňovo 
 Kučín 
 Kučín 
 Kuchyňa 
 Kuklov 
 Kuková 
 Kukučínov 
 Kunerad 
 Kunešov 
 Kunova Teplica 
 Kuraľany 
 Kurima 
 Kurimany 
 Kurimka 
 Kurov 
 Kusín 
 Kútniky 
 Kúty 
 Kuzmice 
 Kuzmice 
 Kvačany 
 Kvačany 
 Bešeňová 
 Kvakovce 
 Kvašov 
 Kvetoslavov 
 Kyjatice 
 Kyjov 
 Kysak 
 Kyselica 
 Kysta 
 Kysucké Nové Mesto 
 Kysucký Lieskovec 
 Láb 
 Lackov 
 Lacková 
 Lada 
 Ladce 
 Ladice 
 Ladmovce 
 Ladomeská Vieska 
 Ladomirová 
 Ladzany 
 Lakšárska Nová Ves 
 Lascov 
 Laskár 
 Lastomír 
 Lastovce 
 Laškovce 
 Látky 
 Lazany 
 Lazisko 
 Lazy pod Makytou 
 Lažany 
 Lednica 
 Lednické Rovne 
 Legnava 
 Lehnice 
 Lehota nad Rimavicou 
 Lehota pod Vtáčnikom 
 Lehota 
 Lehôtka pod Brehmi 
 Lehôtka 
 Lechnica 
 Lekárovce 
 Leľa 
 Leles 
 Lemešany 
 Lenartov 
 Lenartovce 
 Lendak 
 Lenka 
 Lentvora 
 Leopoldov 
 Lesenice 
 Lesíček 
 Lesné 
 Lesnica 
 Lešť 
 Leštiny 
 Letanovce 
 Letničie 
 Leváre 
 Levice 
 Levkuška 
 Levoča 
 Ležiachov 
 Libichava 
 Licince 
 Ličartovce 
 Liesek 
 Lieskovany 
 Liešno 
 Liešťany 
 Lietava 
 Lietavská Lúčka 
 Lietavská Svinná-Babkov 
 Likavka 
 Limbach 
 Lipany 
 Lipník 
 Lipníky 
 Lipová 
 Lipová 
 Lipovany 
 Lipovce 
 Lipové 
 Lipovec 
 Lipovec, Rimavská Sobota 
 Lipovník 
 Lipovník 
 Liptovská Anna 
 Liptovská Kokava 
 Liptovská Lúžna 
 Liptovská Osada 
 Liptovská Porúbka 
 Liptovská Sielnica 
 Liptovská Štiavnica 
 Liptovská Teplá 
 Liptovská Teplička 
 Liptovské Beharovce 
 Liptovské Kľačany 
 Liptovské Matiašovce 
 Liptovské Revúce 
 Liptovské Sliače 
 Liptovský Hrádok 
 Liptovský Ján 
 Liptovský Michal 
 Liptovský Mikuláš 
 Liptovský Ondrej 
 Liptovský Peter 
 Liptovský Trnovec 
 Lisková 
 Lišov 
 Litava 
 Litmanová 
 Livina 
 Livinské Opatovce 
 Livov 
 Livovská Huta 
 Lodno 
 Lok 
 Lokca 
 Lom nad Rimavicou 
 Lomná 
 Lomnička 
 Lontov 
 Lopašov 
 Lopúchov 
 Lopušné Pažite 
 Lošonec 
 Lovce 
 Lovča 
 Lovčica-Trubín 
 Lovinobaňa 
 Lozorno 
 Ložín 
 Ľubá 
 Ľubeľa 
 Lubeník 
 Ľubica 
 Lubina 
 Ľubochňa 
 Ľuboreč 
 Ľuboriečka 
 Ľubotice 
 Ľubotín 
 Ľubovec 
 Lúč na Ostrove 
 Lučenec 
 Lúčina 
 Lučivná 
 Lúčka 
 Lúčka 
 Lúčka 
 Lúčka 
 Lúčky 
 Lúčky 
 Lúčky 
 Lúčnica nad Žitavou 
 Ludanice 
 Ľudovítová 
 Ludrová 
 Luhyňa 
 Lúka 
 Lukáčovce 
 Lukavica 
 Lukov 
 Lukovištia 
 Lúky 
 Lula 
 Lupoč 
 Lutila 
 Ľutina 
 Lutiše 
 Ľutov 
 Lužany pri Topli 
 Lužany 
 Lužianky 
 Lysá pod Makytou 
 Lysica 
 Macov 
 Mad 
 Madunice 
 Magnezitovce 
 Machulince 
 Majcichov 
 Majere 
 Majerovce 
 Makov 
 Malá Čalomija 
 Malá Čausa 
 Malá Čierna 
 Malá Domaša 
 Malá Franková 
 Malá Hradná 
 Malá Ida 
 Malá Lehota 
 Malá Lodina 
 Malá nad Hronom 
 Malá Tŕňa 
 Malacky 
 Málaš 
 Malatiná 
 Malatíny 
 Malcov 
 Malčice 
 Malé Borové 
 Malé Dvorníky 
 Malé Hoste 
 Malé Chyndice 
 Malé Kosihy 
 Malé Kozmálovce 
 Malé Kršteňany 
 Malé Lednice 
 Malé Leváre 
 Malé Ludince 
 Malé Ozorovce 
 Malé Raškovce 
 Malé Ripňany 
 Malé Straciny 
 Malé Trakany 
 Malé Uherce 
 Malé Vozokany 
 Malé Zálužie 
 Malé Zlievce 
 Málinec 
 Malinová 
 Malinovo 
 Malužiná 
 Malý Cetín 
 Malý Čepčín 
 Malý Horeš 
 Malý Kamenec 
 Malý Krtíš 
 Malý Lapáš 
 Malý Lipník 
 Malý Slavkov 
 Malý Slivník 
 Malý Šariš 
 Malženice 
 Maňa 
 Mankovce 
 Marcelová 
 Margecany 
 Marhaň 
 Marianka 
 Markovce 
 Markuška 
 Markušovce 
 Maršová-Rašov 
 Martin nad Žitavou 
 Martin 
 Martinček 
 Martinová 
 Martovce 
 Mašková 
 Matejovce 
 Matiaška 
 Matiašovce 
 Matovce 
 Maťovské Vojkovce 
 Matúškovo 
 Matysová 
 Medovarce 
 Medvedie 
 Medveďov 
 Medzany 
 Medzev 
 Medzianky 
 Medzibrodie nad Oravou 
 Medzilaborce 
 Melčice-Lieskové 
 Melek 
 Meliata 
 Mengusovce 
 Merašice 
 Merník 
 Mestečko 
 Mestisko 
 Mičakovce 
 Mierovo 
 Miezgovce 
 Michal na Ostrove 
 Michal nad Žitavou 
 Michaľany 
 Michalok 
 Michalová 
 Michalovce 
 Miklušovce 
 Mikulášová 
 Mikušovce 
 Milhosť 
 Miloslavov 
 Milpoš 
 Mirkovce 
 Miroľa 
 Mládzovo 
 Mlynárovce 
 Mlynčeky 
 Mlynica 
 Mlynky 
 Mníchova Lehota 
 Mníšek nad Hnilcom 
 Mníšek nad Popradom 
 Moča 
 Močenok 
 Močiar 
 Modra 
 Modrany 
 Modrová 
 Modrovka 
 Modrý Kameň 
 Mojmírovce 
 Mojš 
 Mojtín 
 Mojzesovo 
 Mokrá Lúka 
 Mokrance 
 Mokroluh 
 Nemcovce 
 Mokrý Háj 
 Moldava nad Bodvou 
 Moravany nad Váhom 
 Moravany 
 Moravské Lieskové 
 Moravský Svätý Ján 
 Most pri Bratislave 
 Mostová 
 Moškovec 
 Mošovce 
 Mošurov 
 Motešice 
 Mučín 
 Mudroňovo 
 Mudrovce 
 Muľa 
 Muráň 
 Muránska Dlhá Lúka 
 Muránska Huta 
 Muránska Lehota 
 Muránska Zdychava 
 Mútne 
 Mužla 
 Myjava 
 Mýtna 
 Mýtne Ludany 
 Mýto pod Ďumbierom 
 Nacina Ves 
 Nadlice 
 Ňagov 
 Naháč 
 Nálepkovo 
 Námestovo 
 Nána 
 Nandraž 
 Ňárad 
 Necpaly 
 Nedanovce 
 Nedašovce 
 Neded 
 Nededza 
 Nedožery-Brezany 
 Nemcovce 
 Nemčice 
 Nemčiňany 
 Nemecká 
 Nemečky 
 Nemešany 
 Nemšová 
 Nenince 
 Neporadza 
 Neporadza 
 Nesluša 
 Nesvady 
 Neverice 
 Nevidzany 
 Nevidzany 
 Nevoľné 
 Nezbudská Lúčka 
 Nimnica 
 Nitra nad Ipľom 
 Nitra 
 Nitrianska Blatnica 
 Nitrianska Streda 
 Nitrianske Hrnčiarovce 
 Nitrianske Pravno 
 Nitrianske Rudno 
 Nitrianske Sučany 
 Nitrica 
 Nižná Boca 
 Nižná Hutka 
 Nižná Jedľová 
 Nižná Kamenica 
 Nižná Myšľa 
 Nižná Pisaná 
 Nižná Polianka 
 Nižná Rybnica 
 Nižná Slaná 
 Nižná Voľa 
 Nižná 
 Nižná 
 Nižné Nemecké 
 Nižné Repaše 
 Nižné Ružbachy 
 Nižný Čaj 
 Nižný Hrabovec 
 Nižný Hrušov 
 Nižný Klátov 
 Nižný Komárnik 
 Nižný Kručov 
 Nižný Lánec 
 Nižný Mirošov 
 Nižný Orlík 
 Nižný Skálnik 
 Nižný Slavkov 
 Nižný Tvarožec 
 Nižný Žipov 
 Nolčovo 
 Norovce 
 Nová Baňa 
 Nová Bašta 
 Nová Bošáca 
 Nová Bystrica 
 Nová Dedina 
 Nová Dedinka 
 Nová Dubnica 
 Nová Kelča 
 Nová Lehota 
 Nová Lesná 
 Nová Ľubovňa 
 Nová Polhora 
 Nová Polianka 
 Nová Ves nad Váhom 
 Nová Ves nad Žitavou 
 Nová Ves 
 Nová Vieska 
 Nováčany 
 Nováky 
 Nové Mesto nad Váhom 
 Nové Sady 
 Nové Zámky 
 Novosad 
 Novoť 
 Nový Ruskov 
 Nový Salaš 
 Nový Tekov 
 Nový Život 
 Nýrovce 
 Obeckov 
 Obid 
 Obišovce 
 Oborín 
 Obručné 
 Obyce 
 Očkov 
 Odorín 
 Ohrady 
 Ochodnica 
 Ochtiná 
 Okoč 
 Okoličná na Ostrove 
 Okrúhle 
 Okružná 
 Olcnava 
 Oľdza 
 Olejníkov 
 Olešná 
 Oľka 
 Olováry 
 Oľšavce 
 Oľšavica 
 Oľšavka 
 Oľšinkov 
 Oľšov 
 Olšovany 
 Omastiná 
 Omšenie 
 Ondavka 
 Ondavské Matiašovce 
 Ondrašová 
 Ondrašovce 
 Ondrejovce 
 Opátka 
 Opatovce nad Nitrou 
 Opatovce 
 Opatovská Nová Ves 
 Opava 
 Opiná 
 Opoj 
 Oponice 
 Orávka 
 Oravská Jasenica 
 Oravská Lesná 
 Oravská Polhora 
 Oravská Poruba 
 Oravské Veselé 
 Oravský Biely Potok 
 Oravský Podzámok 
 Ordzovany 
 Orechová Potôň 
 Orechová 
 Oreské 
 Oreské 
 Orešany 
 Orlov 
 Orovnica 
 Ortuťová 
 Osádka 
 Osikov 
 Oslany 
 Osrblie 
 Ostratice 
 Ostrov 
 Ostrov 
 Ostrovany 
 Ostrý Grúň 
 Osturňa 
 Osuské 
 Oščadnica 
 Otrhánky 
 Otročok 
 Ovčiarsko 
 Ovčie 
 Ozdín 
 Ožďany 
 Pača 
 Padáň 
 Padarovce 
 Palárikovo 
 Palín 
 Palota 
 Paňa 
 Panické Dravce 
 Paňovce 
 Papradno 
 Parchovany 
 Párnica 
 Partizánska Ľupča 
 Partizánske 
 Pastovce 
 Pastuchov 
 Pašková 
 Paština Závada 
 Pata 
 Pataš 
 Patince 
 Pavčina Lehota 
 Pavľany 
 Pavlice 
 Pavlova Ves 
 Pavlová 
 Pavlovce 
 Pavlovce 
 Pavlovce nad Uhom 
 Pažiť 
 Pečeňady 
 Pečeňany 
 Pečenice 
 Pečovská Nová Ves 
 Peder 
 Perín-Chym 
 Pernek 
 Petkovce 
 Petrikovce 
 Petrova Lehota 
 Petrova Ves 
 Petrová 
 Petrovany 
 Petrovce nad Laborcom 
 Petrovce 
 Petrovce 
 Petrovce 
 Petrovice 
 Petrovo 
 Pezinok 
 Piešťany 
 Píla 
 Píla 
 Pinkovce 
 Piskorovce 
 Pitelová 
 Plášťovce 
 Plavé Vozokany 
 Plavecké Podhradie 
 Plavecký Mikuláš 
 Plavecký Peter 
 Plavecký Štvrtok 
 Plaveč 
 Plavnica 
 Plechotice 
 Pleš 
 Plešivec 
 Plevník-Drienové 
 Ploské 
 Ploské 
 Pobedim 
 Počarová 
 Počúvadlo 
 Podbiel 
 Podbranč 
 Podbrezová 
 Podhájska 
 Podhorany 
 Podhorany, Kežmarok District 
 Podhorany, Prešov District 
 Podhorie 
 Podhorie 
 Podhoroď 
 Podhradie 
 Podhradie 
 Podhradie 
 Podhradík 
 Podkriváň 
 Podkylava 
 Podlužany 
 Podlužany 
 Podolie 
 Podolínec 
 Podrečany 
 Podskalie 
 Podtureň 
 Podvysoká 
 Pohorelá 
 Pohranice 
 Pohronská Polhora 
 Pohronský Ruskov 
 Pochabany 
 Pokryváč 
 Poľanovce 
 Poľany 
 Poliakovce 
 Polianka 
 Polichno 
 Polina 
 Poľný Kesov 
 Poloma 
 Polomka 
 Poltár 
 Poltár 
 Poluvsie 
 Pongrácovce 
 Poprad 
 Poproč 
 Poproč, Rimavská Sobota 
 Popudinské Močidľany 
 Poráč 
 Poriadie 
 Porostov 
 Poruba pod Vihorlatom 
 Poruba 
 Porúbka 
 Porúbka 
 Porúbka 
 Poša 
 Potok, Rimavská Sobota 
 Potok 
 Potvorice 
 Považany 
 Považská Bystrica 
 Povina 
 Povoda 
 Pozba 
 Pozdišovce 
 Pôtor 
 Praha, Slovakia 
 Prakovce 
 Prašice 
 Prašník 
 Pravenec 
 Pravica 
 Pravotice 
 Práznovce 
 Prečín 
 Predajná 
 Predmier 
 Prenčov 
 Preseľany 
 Prešov 
 Príbelce 
 Pribeník 
 Pribeta 
 Pribiš 
 Príbovce 
 Pribylina 
 Priekopa 
 Priepasné 
 Prietrž 
 Prietržka 
 Prievaly 
 Prievidza 
 Prihradzany 
 Príkra 
 Proč 
 Prochot 
 Prosačov 
 Prosiek 
 Prša 
 Pruské 
 Prusy 
 Pružina 
 Pstriná 
 Ptrukša 
 Pucov 
 Púchov 
 Pukanec 
 Pusté Čemerné 
 Pusté Pole 
 Pusté Sady 
 Pusté Úľany 
 Pušovce 
 Rabča 
 Rabčice 
 Rad 
 Radatice 
 Radava 
 Radimov 
 Radnovce 
 Radobica 
 Radoľa 
 Radoma 
 Radošina 
 Radošovce, Skalica District 
 Radošovce, Trnava District 
 Radôstka 
 Radvaň nad Dunajom 
 Radvaň nad Laborcom 
 Radvanovce 
 Radzovce 
 Rafajovce 
 Rajčany 
 Rajec 
 Rajecká Lesná 
 Rajecké Teplice 
 Rákoš 
 Rákoš 
 Raková 
 Rakovčík 
 Rakovec nad Ondavou 
 Rakovice 
 Rakovnica 
 Rakovo 
 Rakša 
 Rakúsy 
 Rakytník 
 Rankovce 
 Rapovce 
 Raslavice 
 Rastislavice 
 Rašice 
 Ratka 
 Ratková 
 Ratkovce 
 Ratkovo 
 Ratkovská Lehota 
 Ratkovská Suchá 
 Ratkovské Bystré 
 Ratnovce 
 Ratvaj 
 Ráztočno 
 Ráztoka 
 Ražňany 
 Reca 
 Regetovka 
 Rejdová 
 Reľov 
 Remeniny 
 Remetské Hámre 
 Renčišov 
 Repejov 
 Repište 
 Rešica 
 Rešov 
 Revúca 
 Revúcka Lehota 
 Riečka 
 Richnava 
 Richvald 
 Rimavská Baňa 
 Rimavská Seč 
 Rimavská Sobota 
 Rimavské Brezovo 
 Rimavské Janovce 
 Rimavské Zalužany 
 Rišňovce 
 Rohov 
 Rohovce 
 Rohožník 
 Rohožník 
 Rochovce 
 Rokycany 
 Rokytov 
 Rokytovce 
 Rosina 
 Roškovce 
 Roštár 
 Rovensko 
 Rovinka 
 Rovňany 
 Rovné, Rimavská Sobota 
 Rovné 
 Rozhanovce 
 Rozložná 
 Roztoky 
 Rožkovany 
 Rožňava 
 Rožňavské Bystré 
 Rúbaň 
 Rudina 
 Rudinka 
 Rudinská 
 Rudlov 
 Rudná 
 Rudňany 
 Rudnianska Lehota 
 Rudník 
 Rudník 
 Rudno nad Hronom 
 Rudno 
 Rumanová 
 Rumince 
 Ruská Bystrá 
 Ruská Nová Ves 
 Ruská Voľa nad Popradom 
 Ruská Voľa 
 Ruská 
 Ruskov 
 Ruskovce 
 Ruskovce 
 Ruský Hrabovec 
 Ružiná 
 Ružindol 
 Ružomberok 
 Rybany 
 Rybky 
 Rybník 
 Rybník 
 Rykynčice 
 Sabinov 
 Sačurov 
 Sádočné 
 Sady nad Torysou 
 Salka 
 Santovka 
 Sap 
 Sása, Revúca 
 Sása, Zvolen 
 Sasinkovo 
 Sazdice 
 Sebedražie 
 Sebechleby 
 Seč 
 Sečianky 
 Sečovce 
 Sečovská Polianka 
 Sedliacka Dubová 
 Sedlice 
 Sedliská 
 Sedmerovec 
 Sejkov 
 Sekule 
 Seľany 
 Selce (Poltár District) 
 Selce, Krupina District 
 Selec 
 Selice 
 Semerovo 
 Seňa 
 Senec 
 Seniakovce 
 Senica 
 Senné 
 Senné 
 Senohrad 
 Sereď 
 Sihelné 
 Sihla 
 Sikenica 
 Sikenička 
 Siladice 
 Silica 
 Silická Brezová 
 Silická Jablonica 
 Sirk 
 Sirník 
 Skačany 
 Skalica 
 Skalité 
 Skalka nad Váhom 
 Skároš 
 Skerešovo 
 Sklabiná 
 Sklabiňa 
 Sklabinský Podzámok 
 Sklené Teplice 
 Sklené 
 Skrabské 
 Skýcov 
 Sládkovičovo 
 Slančík 
 Slanec 
 Slanská Huta 
 Slanské Nové Mesto 
 Slaska 
 Slatina nad Bebravou 
 Slatina 
 Slatinka nad Bebravou 
 Slatinské Lazy 
 Slatvina 
 Slavec 
 Slavkovce 
 Slavnica 
 Slavoška 
 Slavošovce 
 Sľažany 
 Slepčany 
 Sliač 
 Sliepkovce 
 Slivník 
 Slizké 
 Slopná 
 Slovany 
 Slovenská Kajňa 
 Slovenská Nová Ves 
 Slovenská Ves 
 Slovenské Ďarmoty 
 Slovenské Kľačany 
 Slovenské Nové Mesto 
 Slovenské Pravno 
 Slovenský Grob 
 Slovinky 
 Smilno 
 Smižany 
 Smolenice 
 Smolinské 
 Smolnícka Huta 
 Smolník 
 Smrdáky 
 Smrečany 
 Snakov 
 Snežnica 
 Soblahov 
 Soboš 
 Sobotište 
 Sobrance 
 Socovce 
 Sokoľ 
 Sokoľany 
 Sokolce 
 Sokolovce 
 Soľ 
 Solčany 
 Solčianky 
 Soľnička 
 Sološnica 
 Somotor 
 Spišská Belá 
 Spišská Nová Ves 
 Spišská Stará Ves 
 Spišská Teplica 
 Spišské Bystré 
 Spišské Hanušovce 
 Spišské Podhradie 
 Spišské Tomášovce 
 Spišské Vlachy 
 Spišský Hrhov 
 Spišský Hrušov 
 Spišský Štiavnik 
 Spišský Štvrtok 
 Stanča 
 Stankovany 
 Stankovce 
 Stará Bašta 
 Stará Bystrica 
 Stará Halič 
 Stará Huta 
 Stará Kremnička 
 Stará Lehota 
 Stará Lesná 
 Stará Ľubovňa 
 Stará Myjava 
 Stará Turá 
 Stará Voda 
 Staré 
 Starina, Stará Ľubovňa District 
 Starý Hrádok 
 Starý Tekov 
 Staškov 
 Stebnícka Huta 
 Stebník 
 Stožok 
 Stráňany 
 Stráňavy 
 Stráne pod Tatrami 
 Stránska 
 Stránske 
 Stratená 
 Stráža 
 Strážne 
 Strážske 
 Strečno 
 Streda nad Bodrogom 
 Stredné Plachtince 
 Strekov 
 Stretava 
 Stretavka 
 Streženice 
 Stročín 
 Studená 
 Studenec 
 Studienka 
 Stuľany 
 Stupava 
 Stupné 
 Sučany 
 Sudince 
 Súdovce 
 Suchá Dolina 
 Suchá Hora 
 Suchá nad Parnou 
 Sucháň 
 Suché Brezovo 
 Suché 
 Suchohrad 
 Sukov 
 Sulín 
 Súlovce 
 Súľov-Hradná 
 Sušany 
 Sútor 
 Svätá Mária 
 Svätoplukovo 
 Svätuš 
 Svätuše 
 Svätý Anton 
 Svätý Jur 
 Svätý Kríž 
 Svätý Peter 
 Svederník 
 Sverepec 
 Sveržov 
 Svetlice 
 Svidnička 
 Svidník 
 Svinia 
 Svinica 
 Svinice 
 Svinná 
 Svit 
 Svodín 
 Svrbice 
 Svrčinovec 
 Šahy 
 Šajdíkove Humence 
 Šaľa 
 Šalgočka 
 Šalgovce 
 Šalov 
 Šambron 
 Šamorín 
 Šamudovce 
 Šarbov 
 Šarišská Poruba 
 Šarišská Trstená 
 Šarišské Bohdanovce 
 Šarišské Čierne 
 Šarišské Dravce 
 Šarišské Jastrabie 
 Šarišské Michaľany 
 Šarišské Sokolovce 
 Teriakovce 
 Šarišský Štiavnik 
 Šarkan 
 Šarovce 
 Šašová 
 Šaštín-Stráže 
 Šávoľ 
 Šelpice 
 Šemetkovce 
 Šemša 
 Šemša 
 Šenkvice 
 Šiatorská Bukovinka 
 Šiba 
 Šíd 
 Šimonovce 
 Šindliar 
 Šintava 
 Šípkov 
 Šípkové 
 Širákov 
 Širkovce 
 Široké 
 Šišov 
 Šivetice 
 Šoltýska 
 Šoporňa 
 Špačince 
 Špania Dolina 
 Španie Pole 
 Šrobárová 
 Štefanov nad Oravou 
 Štefanov 
 Štefanová 
 Štefanovce 
 Štefanovce 
 Štefanovičová 
 Štefurov 
 Šterusy 
 Štiavnické Bane 
 Štiavnička 
 Štiavnik 
 Štitáre 
 Štítnik 
 Štós 
 Štós 
 Štôla 
 Štrba 
 Štrkovec 
 Štúrovo 
 Štvrtok na Ostrove 
 Štvrtok 
 Šuja 
 Šuľa 
 Šumiac 
 Šuňava 
 Šurany 
 Šurianky 
 Šurice 
 Šúrovce 
 Šutovce 
 Šútovo 
 Švábovce 
 Švedlár 
 Švošov 
 Tachty 
 Tajná 
 Ťapešovo 
 Tarnov 
 Tašuľa 
 Tatranská Javorina 
 Tehla 
 Tekolďany 
 Tekovská Breznica 
 Tekovské Lužany 
 Tekovské Nemce 
 Tekovský Hrádok 
 Telgárt 
 Telince 
 Temeš 
 Teplička 
 Teplička nad Váhom 
 Tepličky 
 Teplý Vrch 
 Terany 
 Terchová 
 Terňa 
 Tesáre 
 Tesárske Mlyňany 
 Tešedíkovo 
 Tibava 
 Tichý Potok 
 Timoradza 
 Tisovec 
 Tlmače 
 Točnica 
 Tomášikovo 
 Tomášov 
 Tomášovce 
 Topoľčany 
 Topoľčianky 
 Topoľnica 
 Topoľníky 
 Toporec 
 Tornaľa 
 Torysa 
 Torysky 
 Tovarné 
 Tovarnianska Polianka 
 Tovarníky 
 Tôň 
 Trakovice 
 Trávnica 
 Trávnik 
 Trebatice 
 Trebejov 
 Trebeľovce 
 Trebichava 
 Uhrovec 
 Trebišov 
 Trebostovo 
 Trebušovce 
 Trenč 
 Trenčianska Teplá 
 Trenčianska Turná 
 Trenčianske Bohuslavice 
 Trenčianske Jastrabie 
 Trenčianske Mitice 
 Trenčianske Stankovce 
 Trenčianske Teplice 
 Trenčín 
 Trhová Hradská 
 Trhovište 
 Trnavá Hora 
 Trnava pri Laborci 
 Trnava 
 Trnávka 
 Trnávka 
 Trnkov 
 Trnovec nad Váhom 
 Trnovec 
 Trnovo 
 Tročany 
 Trpín 
 Trsťany 
 Trstená na Ostrove 
 Trstená 
 Trstené pri Hornáde 
 Trstené 
 Trstice 
 Trstín 
 Tuhár 
 Tuhrina 
 Tuchyňa 
 Tulčík 
 Tupá 
 Turá 
 Turany 
 Turček 
 Turčianky 
 Turčianska Štiavnička 
 Turčianske Jaseno 
 Turčianske Kľačany 
 Turčianske Teplice 
 Turčiansky Ďur 
 Turčiansky Peter 
 Turčok 
 Tureň 
 Turie 
 Turík 
 Turňa nad Bodvou 
 Turnianska Nová Ves 
 Turzovka 
 Tušice 
 Tušická Nová Ves 
 Tužina 
 Tvarožná 
 Tvrdomestice 
 Tvrdošín 
 Tvrdošovce 
 Úbrež 
 Udiča 
 Údol 
 Uhliská 
 Úhorna 
 Uhorská Ves 
 Uhorské 
 Uhrovské Podhradie 
 Úľany nad Žitavou 
 Uloža 
 Uňatín 
 Unín 
 Urmince 
 Utekáč 
 Uzovce 
 Uzovská Panica 
 Uzovské Pekľany 
 Uzovský Šalgov 
 Vaďovce 
 Vagrinec 
 Váhovce 
 Vajkovce 
 Valaliky 
 Valaská Belá 
 Valaská Dubová 
 Valaská 
 Valča 
 Valentovce 
 Valice 
 Valkovce 
 Vaľkovňa 
 Vaniškovce 
 Vápeník 
 Varadka 
 Varhaňovce 
 Varín 
 Vasiľov 
 Vavrečka 
 Vavrinec 
 Vavrišovo 
 Važec 
 Včelince 
 Večelkov 
 Vechec 
 Veľaty 
 Velčice 
 Veličná 
 Veľká Čalomija 
 Veľká Čausa 
 Veľká Čierna 
 Veľká Dolina 
 Veľká Franková 
 Veľká Hradná 
 Veľká Ida 
 Veľká Lehota 
 Veľká Lesná 
 Veľká Lodina 
 Veľká Lomnica 
 Veľká Mača 
 Veľká nad Ipľom 
 Veľká Paka 
 Veľká Tŕňa 
 Veľká Ves nad Ipľom 
 Veľká Ves 
 Veľké Bierovce 
 Veľké Blahovo 
 Veľké Borové 
 Veľké Dravce 
 Veľké Držkovce 
 Veľké Dvorany 
 Veľké Dvorníky 
 Veľké Hoste 
 Veľké Chlievany 
 Veľké Chyndice 
 Veľké Kapušany 
 Veľké Kosihy 
 Veľké Kostoľany 
 Veľké Kozmálovce 
 Veľké Kršteňany 
 Veľké Leváre 
 Veľké Lovce 
 Veľké Ludince 
 Veľké Orvište 
 Veľké Ozorovce 
 Veľké Pole 
 Veľké Raškovce 
 Veľké Revištia 
 Veľké Ripňany 
 Veľké Rovné 
 Veľké Slemence 
 Veľké Straciny 
 Veľké Teriakovce 
 Veľké Trakany 
 Veľké Turovce 
 Veľké Uherce 
 Veľké Úľany 
 Veľké Vozokany 
 Veľké Zálužie 
 Veľké Zlievce 
 Veľký Biel 
 Veľký Blh 
 Veľký Cetín 
 Veľký Čepčín 
 Veľký Ďur 
 Veľký Folkmár 
 Veľký Grob 
 Veľký Horeš 
 Veľký Kamenec 
 Veľký Klíž 
 Veľký Krtíš 
 Veľký Kýr 
 Veľký Lapáš 
 Veľký Lipník 
 Veľký Lom 
 Veľký Meder 
 Veľký Slavkov 
 Veľký Slivník 
 Veľký Šariš 
 Velušovce 
 Vernár 
 Veselé 
 Veterná Poruba 
 Vidiná 
 Vieska nad Blhom 
 Vieska nad Žitavou 
 Vieska, Veľký Krtíš District 
 Vieska 
 Vígľaš 
 Vígľašská Huta-Kalinka 
 Vikartovce 
 Vinica, Veľký Krtíš 
 Viničky 
 Viničné 
 Vinné 
 Vinodol 
 Vinohrady nad Váhom 
 Vinosady 
 Virt 
 Vislanka 
 Visolaje 
 Višňov 
 Višňové 
 Višňové 
 Višňové 
 Vištuk 
 Vitanová 
 Víťaz 
 Vítkovce 
 Vlača 
 Vlachovo 
 Vlachy 
 Vlčany 
 Vlčkovce 
 Vlkas 
 Vlková 
 Vlkovce 
 Vlky 
 Vlkyňa 
 Voderady 
 Vojany 
 Vojčice 
 Vojka nad Dunajom 
 Vojka 
 Vojkovce 
 Vojňany 
 Vojnatina 
 Voľa 
 Volica 
 Volkovce 
 Voznica 
 Vozokany 
 Vozokany 
 Vráble 
 Vrádište 
 Vrakúň 
 Vranov nad Topľou 
 Vrbnica 
 Vrbov 
 Vrbová nad Váhom 
 Vrbovce 
 Vrbové 
 Vrbovka 
 Vrchteplá 
 Vrícko 
 Vršatské Podhradie 
 Vrútky 
 Vtáčkovce 
 Výborná 
 Výčapy-Opatovce 
 Vydrany 
 Vydrná 
 Vydrník 
 Vyhne 
 Východná 
 Výrava 
 Bánovce nad Bebravou 
 Vysoká nad Kysucou 
 Vysoká nad Uhom 
 Vysoká pri Morave 
 Vysoká 
 Vysoká 
 Vysoké Tatry 
 Vyškovce nad Ipľom 
 Vyšná Boca 
 Vyšná Hutka 
 Vyšná Jedľová 
 Vyšná Kamenica 
 Vyšná Myšľa 
 Vyšná Pisaná 
 Vyšná Polianka 
 Vyšná Rybnica 
 Vyšná Slaná 
 Vyšná Šebastová 
 Vyšná Voľa 
 Vyšné nad Hronom 
 Vyšné Nemecké 
 Vyšné Remety 
 Vyšné Repaše 
 Vyšné Ružbachy 
 Vyšné Valice 
 Vyšný Čaj 
 Vyšný Kazimír 
 Vyšný Klátov 
 Vyšný Komárnik 
 Vyšný Kručov 
 Vyšný Kubín 
 Vyšný Mirošov 
 Vyšný Orlík 
 Vyšný Skálnik 
 Vyšný Slavkov 
 Vyšný Tvarožec 
 Vyšný Žipov 
 Zábiedovo 
 Záborie 
 Záborské 
 Zádiel 
 Zádor 
 Záhor 
 Záhorce 
 Záhorie 
 Záhorská Ves 
 Záhradné 
 Zacharovce 
 Zákamenné 
 Zákopčie 
 Zalaba 
 Zálesie 
 Zálesie 
 Zalužice 
 Zamarovce 
 Zámutov 
 Záriečie 
 Záskalie 
 Zatín 
 Závada 
 Závada 
 Závadka nad Hronom 
 Závadka 
 Zavar 
 Závažná Poruba 
 Závod 
 Zázrivá 
 Zbehňov 
 Zbehy 
 Zbojné 
 Zborov nad Bystricou 
 Zborov 
 Zbrojníky 
 Zbudská Belá 
 Zbudza 
 Zbyňov 
 Zeleneč 
 Zemianska Olča 
 Zemianske Kostoľany 
 Zemianske Podhradie 
 Zemianske Sady 
 Zemiansky Vrbovok 
 Zemné 
 Zemplín 
 Zemplínska Nová Ves 
 Zemplínska Široká 
 Zemplínska Teplica 
 Zemplínske Hradište 
 Zemplínske Jastrabie 
 Zemplínske Kopčany 
 Zemplínsky Branč 
 Zlatá Baňa 
 Zlatá Idka 
 Zlaté Klasy 
 Zlaté Moravce 
 Zlaté 
 Zlatná na Ostrove 
 Zlatník 
 Zlatníky 
 Zlatno 
 Zlatno 
 Zliechov 
 Zohor 
 Zombor 
 Zubák 
 Zuberec 
 Zubrohlava 
 Zvolen 
 Zvončín 
 Žabokreky nad Nitrou 
 Žabokreky 
 Žakarovce 
 Žakovce 
 Žalobín 
 Žarnov 
 Žarnovica 
 Žaškov 
 Žbince 
 Ždaňa 
 Ždiar 
 Žehňa 
 Žehra 
 Železná Breznica 
 Železník 
 Želiezovce 
 Želmanov 
 Želovce 
 Žemberovce 
 Žemliare 
 Žiar nad Hronom 
 Žiar 
 Žiar 
 Žibritov 
 Žihárec 
 Žikava 
 Žilina 
 Žíp 
 Žipov 
 Žirany 
 Žitavany 
 Žitavce 
 Žitná-Radiša 
 Žlkovce 
 Župčany 
 Župkov

References

External links
 Former names of all of Slovakia's towns and villages prior to WWI (1918)

 
Subdivisions of Slovakia
Slovakia, Municipalities
Slovakia 3
Municipalities, Slovakia
Villages in Slovakia
Municipalities
Slovakia